The Howard DGA-8, DGA-9, DGA-11, and DGA-12 were a family of four-place, single-engine, high-wing light monoplanes built by the Howard Aircraft Corporation, Chicago, Illinois from 1936.

Development

The various models were distinguished by different engine choices and detail changes, and were built and sold in parallel to each other. A number of examples were built as one type and converted to another during their lifetimes. A favorite of the high society and Hollywood circles, the DGA-11 cost about $16,500 in 1938. These aircraft were a direct developments of the famous Howard racing plane Mister Mulligan. Designer/pilot Ben Howard's "DGA" prefix stood for "Damned Good Airplane".

History

The DGA-6's racing success brought the DGA series much attention, and in its various permutations, differentiated mainly by different powerplants, the DGAs -8, -9, -11, -12 (and later DGA-15) emerged as coveted aircraft, owned by corporations, wealthy individuals, and movie stars, such as Wallace Beery, who was himself a pilot. Spanish conductor and pianist Jose Iturbi owned and flew a DGA-11 "El Turia" (NC22402). In an era when airlines were flying DC-3s, the Howards at 160 to  could match their speed and range. The rear seat exceeded airline leg room with limousine-like spaciousness. With its high wing loading, the Howards rode through most turbulence with airline-like solidity. The -11 was probably the ultimate of the series. Configured as a four-place aircraft, with the  Pratt & Whitney R-985, it is graceful and powerful with perfectly classical lines.

With America's entry into World War II, most of the civilian Howards were commandeered by the military. The Army used them as officer transports and as ambulance planes. They were used variously as an officer's utility transport and for instrument training. The Howard was and is an excellent instrument platform, very stable and solid, especially compared to modern light aircraft.

A number of these aircraft still fly, and another example of a DGA-11, restored by Jim Younkin, can be seen in the Arkansas Air & Military Museum.

Variants

 DGA-8 - version with Wright R-760 engine (18 built, 1 impressed by USAAF as UC-70C)
 DGA-9 - version with Jacobs L-5 engine (7 built, 2 impressed by USAAF as UC-70D)
 DGA-11 - version with Pratt & Whitney Wasp Junior engine (4 built; several more converted from DGA-8, -9 etc.)
 DGA-12 - version with Jacobs L-6 engine (2 built, both impressed by USAAF as UC-70A)
 UC-70 - DGA-8/ -9/ -12 and -15 aircraft impressed into service with the USAAC as utility transports.

Specifications (DGA-11)

See also

References

Notes

Bibliography
 
 
 Howard Aircraft Foundation website

1930s United States civil utility aircraft
DGA-08
Single-engined tractor aircraft
High-wing aircraft
Aircraft first flown in 1936